Adaran Rural District is in Asara District of Karaj County, Alborz province, Iran. At the census of 2006, its population was 8,995 in 2,681 households, and in the most recent census of 2016, it had decreased to 7,679 in 2,743 households. The largest of its 31 villages was Kondor, with 1,922 people.

References 

Karaj County

Rural Districts of Alborz Province

Populated places in Alborz Province

Populated places in Karaj County